“Wife-Wooing” is a work of short fiction by John Updike which first appeared in The New Yorker on March 12, 1960. The story was collected in  Too Far to Go: The Maples Stories (1979), published by Fawcett Publications.

Plot
The story, like Updike's Rabbit Run (1960), is written in the present tense, employing the second-person singular “you” when the protagonist addresses his wife. “Wife-Wooing” is part of the Maples family saga, first collected in  Too Far to Go: The Maples Stories (1979) No plot develops, and though unnamed, the married couple are Joan and Richard Maple.

The story opens in what appears to be an interlude of domestic bliss; a husband and wife are enjoying a simple repast in front of a warm fireplace with their three young children. The husband reflects that they have been married for seven years. He is still moved by his wife's body, and pleasurably contemplates that her thighs resemble those of a female character in James Joyce’s novel Ulysses. He notes to himself how immeasurably more difficult it is to court a prospective wife than to merely seduce an inexperienced girl.

The children quarrel over their meal that the father has picked up at a near-by fast-food outlet, but they are indulged by their parents. The husband draws strength from his wife and yearns for sexual intimacy. He reminds her of their honeymoon and the consummation of marriage. His idealized memory of their love-making that night is not shared by the wife. After putting the children to bed, she retires to the bedroom and falls asleep before he can initiate sex.
In the morning, the husband has lost his carnal desires. In the clamor of the demands by their children at breakfast, his wife appears physically repellant. The husband departs the domain of domesticity and arrives at work where the imperatives of earning money are paramount. He returns home still preoccupied with his job. His wife administers his dinner as a perfunctory exercise. The children are sent to bed.

The husband roams about smoking cigarettes that evening, still distracted by his job. In a daze, he prepares to go to bed. His wife enters the bedroom and bestows upon him a sweet and seductive kiss.

Style and Theme

Literary critic Richard H. Rupp comments on the “baroque style” evident in “Wife-Wooing.”

Biographer Adam Begley notes Updike's expression of thwarted sexual desire in “one of the cruelest” passages of the story depicting the mother of the narrator's three young children:

Updike's application of lyricism to the mundane aspects of a housewife's existence is stylistically part of the “wooing.”  Literary critic Mary Allen discerns a measure of egalitarianism in the husband's endeavors to woo his wife:

Allen adds: “Most couples in Updike’s fiction continue to work for some unnameable goal which makes their lives if not extraordinary, at least worth living.”

Literary critic Jane Barnes recognized the generally positive characteristics with which Updike endows the narrator:

Literary critic Richard Detweiler comments on the preternatural nature of the domestic scene Updike offers in the “rose window” passage:

Detwieler adds: “When, at the end, the wife comes to her husband in bed eager for sexual love, it is a gift he must recognize and accept as such; it is as old as human history yet as new and unique as the individuality as experiencing can make it.”

Footnotes

Sources 
Allen, Mary. 1976. John Updike’s Love of “Dull Bovine Beauty from The Necessary Blankness: Women in Major American Fiction of the Sixties. from University of Illinois Press, 1976 in John Updike: Modern Critical Views, Harold Bloom, editor. pp. 69-95 
Barnes, Jane. 1981. John Updike: A Literary Spider from Virginia Quarterly Review 57 no. 1 (Winter 1981) in John Updike: Modern Critical Views, Harold Bloom, editor. pp. 111-125 
Begley, Adam. 2014. Updike. Harpercollins Publishers, New York. 
Carduff, Christopher.  2013. Ref. 1  Note on the Texts in John Updike: Collected Early Stories. Christopher Carduff, editor. The Library of America. pp. 910-924 
Detweiler, Robert. 1984. John Updike. Twayne Publishers, G. K. Hall & Co., Boston, Massachusetts.  (Paperback).
Luscher, Robert M. 1993. John Updike: A Study of the Short Fiction. Twayne Publishers, New York. 
Macnaughton, William R. 1982. Introduction to Critical Essays on John Updike. G. K. Hall & Co., Boston, Massasschuts.  
Rupp, Richard H.. 1970. John Updike: Style in Search of a Center, from Celebration in Post-War American Fiction: 1945–1967, University of Miami Press, in John Updike: Modern Critical Views, Harold Bloom, editor. 
Pritchard, Richard H.. 2000. Updike: America's Man of Letters.'' Steerforth Press, Southroyalton, Vermont.

1960 short stories
Short stories by John Updike
Works originally published in The New Yorker